Alexander Brunst-Zöllner (born 7 July 1995) is a German professional footballer who plays as a goalkeeper for SV Darmstadt 98.

Career
Brunst made his professional debut for 1. FC Magdeburg on 24 October 2017, starting in a home match in the second round of the 2017–18 DFB-Pokal against Borussia Dortmund.

After a trial, Brunst joined newly promoted Danish Superliga club Vejle Boldklub on 7 September 2020, signing a deal until the summer 2022. On 19 June 2022, Vejle confirmed that they had agreed to terminate Brunst's contract at the player's own request, as the German had expressed that he wanted to live closer to his family since he had recently become a father.

One day later, on 20 June 2022, Brunst joined 2. Bundesliga club SV Darmstadt 98 on a deal until June 2024.

References

External links
 

1995 births
Living people
People from Neumünster
German footballers
Footballers from Schleswig-Holstein
Association football goalkeepers
Germany youth international footballers
2. Bundesliga players
3. Liga players
Regionalliga players
Hamburger SV II players
Hamburger SV players
VfL Wolfsburg II players
1. FC Magdeburg players
Vejle Boldklub players
SV Darmstadt 98 players
German expatriate footballers
German expatriate sportspeople in Denmark
Expatriate men's footballers in Denmark